The Great Gibraltar Sand Dune is an ancient sand dune in the British Overseas Territory of Gibraltar. It forms part of the Upper Rock Nature Reserve and dominates the eastern cliffs of the Rock of Gibraltar. It was once used to capture rainwater which was contained in underground tanks within the Rock to satisfy the population's potable water needs.

Geology

The prehistoric dune is made from yellow, windblown sands lacking the red component of the sands on the west side of the Rock. It is made of the same sand that once formed part of a vast savanna of the late Pleistocene where Neanderthals hunted. The levant winds of prehistory continuously blew sand from this savanna westwards, accumulating against the eastern cliffs of the Rock, reaching from the base of the cliff right down to sea level (at that time there was no road where Sir Herbert Miles Road is today). The occasional rockfall from the precipice above added boulders to the dune so the formation seen today is a consolidated composite of rocks and windblown sands. The upper limits of the dune were scarped by the British garrison for two reasons - to avoid soldiers deserting the place and to prevent surprise attacks by Spanish troops. The Great Sand Dune was constantly shifting right up to the late 19th century when corrugated iron sheets were laid over the dune for the collection of rainwater. John White described this and the efforts to make it inaccessible:
"The Eastern side of the hill consists of an immense sloping bank of whitish sand interspersed with huge fragments of rock, and reaching from the sea nearly to the summit of the rock in some parts not far from the Signal House, and the Middle-hill Guards. These parts were formerly accessible, which made it necessary to keep constant guards there, as well to prevent desertions from within as a surprise from without. Of late years, much labour has been bestowed in making all these parts more abrupt and difficult, yet it is still necessary to watch them, as there are always some hardy adventurers who will wantonly risk their lives down these perilous cliffs, either in attempting to desert or in search of flowers."

Water catchments

Gibraltar has few natural sources of fresh water which has been historically problematic for its population over the centuries. They were officially inaugurated by Governor of Gibraltar Sir George White in 1901. These reservoirs were initially fed by relatively small water catchment areas on the western side of the Rock above the Moorish Castle.

As Gibraltar's population and demand for a fresh water supply increased, further sources of supply were required and a scheme to expand the system was proposed and carried out. This consisted of the construction of a  water catchment area on the east side of the Rock and the driving of an  tunnel through the Rock running east-west to channel the water to the existing reservoirs. The catchment which was the original idea of the then City Engineer of Gibraltar and was constructed in 1903 on the Great Sand Dune which has an average inclination of 1⅓ to 1. The largest of the boulders embedded in the dune were blasted away in order to trim the surface as even as possible. A footpath and channel for the collection of rainwater were constructed along the lower perimeter of the catchment area. Timber piles  x  x  were driven their full length into the smoothed dune. To these a timber framing of  x  x  purlins and  x  x  rafters were nailed to them which was followed by screwing corrugated galvanised iron sheets  x  round the edges. Further expansions of the Great Sand Dune catchments were carried out in stages up until 1961. It took roughly 5,928 rafters, 1,112 purlins, 1,161 piles, 5,928 sheets, 2,920 kg of screws and 850 kg of washers for every hectare of the Great Dune that was covered.

Other uses
The Great Dune served to maintain a regular supply of sand on the eastern beaches of Gibraltar, especially Sandy Bay particularly when the sea removed material from the beach. This dynamic nature meant that little vegetation of any significant height could grow on the dune with any permanence as many pre-catchment photographs demonstrate.

In 2001, the Gibraltar Ornithological and Natural History Society began to manage the phased work of dismantling the catchment construction. By 2006 the slope was entirely restored to its natural state and is now completely covered in vegetation native to the  habitat of Gibraltar.

See also
 Upper Rock Nature Reserve
 Sandy Bay, Gibraltar
 Water supply and sanitation in Gibraltar

References

Water supply and sanitation in Gibraltar
Dunes of Gibraltar